"La Bomba" is the debut single released by Bolivian band Azul Azul. The song reached #1 on the Billboard Top Latin Songs and Billboard Tropical Songs charts.

Charts

Certifications

King Africa cover version 

In 2000, Argentine project King Africa released in many countries his version of "La Bomba" as a single from the eponymous album. His cover version was then re-issued in 2001 in more countries, including Switzerland, then re-issued again in 2003 in France. Throughout these re-issues, the King Africa version was a top-10 hit in France, Switzerland, Belgium (Flanders) and Italy.

A megamix available on the 12" maxi includes "Mama Yo Quiero", "Ciudad Maravillosa", "El Camaleon", "Bailando Pump It Up", "Salta" and "Toda España Esta Bailando".

Track listings
 CD maxi
 "La Bomba" (original radio mix) — 3:20
 "La Bomba" (English radio mix) — 3:36
 "La Bomba" (Caribe radio mix) — 3:53
 "La Bomba" (extended mix) — 5:03
 "La Bomba" (Caribe extended mix) — 5:47

 CD maxi
 "La Bomba" (radio edit) — 3:20
 "La Bomba" (extended mix) — 5:01
 "King Africa megamix" — 4:47
 "Mama Yo Quiero" — 3:51

 7" single
 "La Bomba" (extended mix) — 5:00
 "La Bomba" (radio mix) — 3:20

 12" maxi
 "La Bomba" — 3:20
 "Mama Yo Quiero" — 3:51
 "King Africa megamix" — 4:47
 "Bailando Pump It Up" — 4:24

Charts and sales

Weekly charts

Year-end charts

Decade-end charts

Certifications

Other versions
In 2001, the Brazilian group Braga Boys released their version of the song in Portuguese, titled "Uma Bomba", and it became a big hit in the country.

See also
List of number-one Billboard Hot Latin Tracks of 2001
List of number-one Billboard Hot Tropical Songs of 2001

References

1998 songs
1998 singles
2000 singles
King África songs
Sony Discos singles